Daniel Moore (born 1941 in Walla Walla, Washington, U.S.) is an American musician, singer and songwriter.

He co-wrote the song "My Maria" with B. W. Stevenson.  Recorded by the latter, the song was a pop hit in 1973.  Moore also wrote the song "Shambala", a song which was a hit for both B. W. Stevenson and Three Dog Night that same year. "My Maria" was also a country hit in 1996 when recorded by Brooks and Dunn. In addition, Moore has written songs for other artists, including Joe Cocker and Bonnie Raitt.

In late 1975, he contributed backing vocals for the tracks on Bo Diddley's The 20th Anniversary of Rock 'n' Roll all-star album.

Moore currently runs his own record label, DJM Records.

As a song writer, Daniel Moore has had songs recorded by:
Joe Cocker, multiple songs
The Everly Brothers, "Deliver Me" 1967
Tom Scott, "Deliver Me" 1968
The Hughes Corporation, "One More River to Cross" 1971
B.W. Stevenson, "My Maria" 1973
Three Dog Night, "Shambala" 1973
James and Bobby Purify, "Lay Me Down Easy" 1974
Bobby Blue Bland, "Yolanda" 1974
Bonnie Bramlet, "How Do I Love You" 1975
Kenny Rogers, "Oregon" (Give Me Wings) 1975
Solomon Burke, "Shambala" 1975
Jennifer Warnes,  "Bring Ol’ Maggie Back  Home"   1976
John Hartford & The Dillards, "Join the Old Refrain" 1976
David Clayton Thomas, "Somebody I Trusted" (Put Out The Light) 1976
Bonnie Raitt, "Sweet Forgiveness" 1976
Canned Heat, "One More River to Cross" 1977
Levon Helm, "Driving at Night" 1978
Waylon Jennings, "Jack-A-Diamonds" 1978
Thelma Houston, "Lost and Found" 1979
Jerry Jeff Walker, "Cross the Borderline" 1982
Kim Carnes, "Take Me Home to Where My Heart Is" 1984
Maria Muldaur, "Lean Back Hold Steady"" 1986
Colin James, "Crazy over You" 1990
The Band, "Shine a Light" 1993
The Dillards, "Let It Fly" 1994
The Association, "Dreamland" 1995
Brooks & Dunn, "My Maria" 1996
Marsha Ball, "So Many Rivers to Cross" 2006
Toby Keith, "Shambala" 2011

Discography
Daniel Moore - 1970
Yosemite Wonderland - 1997
Riding a Horse & Holding up the World - 1998
Martin & Daniel - 2007
The Giveaway - 2007
Thoughts of a TV Chair - 2007
Limited Parking - 2008
The Wolf and the Chicken - 2009
Maintain - 2009

References

External links 
 DJM Records

1941 births
Dunhill Records artists
Living people
People from Walla Walla, Washington
Singer-songwriters from Washington (state)